Michael Agazzi (born 3 July 1984) is an Italian former footballer who played as a goalkeeper. He is currently working as a youth coach at Real Calepina.

Club career

Early career
Agazzi was a youth product of Atalanta. He start his professional career in Südtirol.

Triestina
In 2004 Triestina signed Agazzi from Atalanta on loan. In June 2005, Triestina signed Agazzi on a co-ownership deal, for €40,000 fee. In June 2006 Triestina signed Agazzi  outright for an additional €250,000 fee.

Since 2008–09 season, Agazzi has been the first choice goalkeeper, after the departure of Generoso Rossi.

Cagliari
On 9 July 2009 Cagliari signed the goalkeeper from Serie B club Triestina in a joint ownership deal, for €575,000 on a 4-year deal. He would continue to play for Triestina until June 2010.

However, on 1 February 2010 he returned to Cagliari, 5 months earlier, on a temporary deal for €1.2 million loan fee. Triestina also acquired Agazzi outright for €500. Co-currently, Triestina signed Alex Calderoni as a replacement. On 21 June 2010, Cagliari signed the keeper outright from the relegated side for €50,000 fee. (later Triestina was re-admitted to Serie B)

He became the first choice goalkeeper for Cagliari in 2010–11 season after the original one, Federico Marchetti, was frozen by the club as punishment. Ivan Pelizzoli, former internationals, also hinted he is the backup of Agazzi instead of Marchetti at the start of season. In July 2011 he signed a new 3-year contract with the Serie A club.

Chievo
Cagliari and Agazzi did not form any agreement on new contract, thus in January 2014 Agazzi was transferred to Chievo, with Marco Silvestri moved to Cagliari on a temporary deal.

Milan
On 22 May 2014, Milan announced the summer signing of Agazzi from Chievo, with the transfer taking effect from 1 July. News of Agazzi's arrival came just a day after the renewal of Christian Abbiati's contract at the Milanese-based club. Agazzi would replace Marco Amelia who was not offered a contract extension by Milan.

Middlesbrough
On 29 August 2015, Middlesbrough announced the signing on loan of Agazzi from Milan.

Cesena
On 18 July 2016, Agazzi left Milan and joined Cesena on a permanent deal.

Alessandria & Ascoli
On 18 July 2017 Agazzi signed a one-year contract with Alessandria. He was assigned number 22 shirt. On 30 January 2018, he was exchanged with Riccardo Ragni of Ascoli. Agazzi also wore number 22 shirt for his new club.

Cremonese
On 16 November 2018, he signed with Cremonese.

International career
Agazzi played for Italy U21 B team against Bosnia and Herzegovina U21 team in 2005. He was a substitute of fellow goalkeeper Mario Cassano.

Coaching
In July 2022 it was confirmed, that Agazzi had been hired as a youth coach at Serie D side Real Calepina.

References

External links
 
 
 AIC profile  

1984 births
Living people
Sportspeople from the Province of Bergamo
Italian footballers
Association football goalkeepers
F.C. Südtirol players
U.S. Triestina Calcio 1918 players
U.S. Sassuolo Calcio players
Calcio Foggia 1920 players
Cagliari Calcio players
A.C. ChievoVerona players
A.C. Milan players
Middlesbrough F.C. players
A.C. Cesena players
U.S. Alessandria Calcio 1912 players
Ascoli Calcio 1898 F.C. players
U.S. Cremonese players
Serie A players
Serie B players
Serie C players
Italian expatriate footballers
Expatriate footballers in England
Footballers from Lombardy